JRX may refer to:
 Jerinx, an Indonesian musician
 Bell 505 Jet Ranger X, an American/Canadian light helicopter